Hebron is a historic home located near Bethel, Shelby County, Missouri.  It was built about 1852, and is a two-story, brick and wood-frame building sheathed with clapboard.  It has a medium pitched gable roof.  It is a remaining building in one of four support areas associated with the Bethel German Conmunal Colony which lasted from 1844 to 1879, and founded by Dr. William Keil (1812-1877).

It was listed on the National Register of Historic Places in 1978.

See also
Elim

References

Houses on the National Register of Historic Places in Missouri
Houses completed in 1852
Buildings and structures in Shelby County, Missouri
National Register of Historic Places in Shelby County, Missouri